Iya Viktorovna Gavrilova (born 3 September 1987) is a Russian ice hockey player, currently affiliated with the Calgary section of the Professional Women's Hockey Players Association (PWHPA). She was a member of the Russian national team during 2003 to 2016 and represented Russia at the Winter Olympic Games in 2006, 2010, and 2014, and at eleven IIHF Women's World Championships, winning bronze medals at the tournaments in 2013 and 2016 At the 2015 Winter Universiade in Granada, Spain, Gavrilova was part of Russia's gold medal-winning team, the first team to defeat Canada in FISU women's ice hockey history.

Playing career
Gavrilova’s ice hockey career started in 1998, in the Russian Women's Hockey League with Lokomotiv Krasnoyarsk. She began playing with SKIF Moscow in 2002 and later played with Tornado Moscow Region during the 2006–07, 2008–09, and 2009–10 seasons. 

She joined the Minnesota Duluth Bulldogs women's ice hockey program during the 2007–08 season, tallying 19 goals and 22 assists for 41 points in 26 games; she ranked second on the team for points per game with an exceptional 1.58 in her rookie campaign.

Gavrilova also played with the Minnesota Whitecaps of the Western Women's Hockey League (WWHL) during the 2010–11 season.

Calgary Dinos
She enrolled at the University of Calgary, where she helped lead the Calgary Dinos women's ice hockey team to a CIS championship in her first season. Gavrilova was the recipient of the 2015 Brodrick Trophy, awarded to the Most Outstanding Player in CIS women's ice hockey. During the 2014–15 season, Gavrilova led the CIS in goals scored and plus/minus rating.

CWHL
Gavrilova was selected in the third round of the 2016 CWHL Draft by the Calgary Inferno. Making her debut with the Calgary Inferno on 29 October 2016, in a contest against the Boston Blades, Gavrilova would also achieve her first multi-point performance with the club in her debut. Starting with a second period assist on a goal by Jillian Saulnier, she would score her first CWHL goal later in the period against Lauren Dahm. Gaining the assists on said goal were Meghan Mikkelson and Hayeligh Cudmore. In a two-game exhibition series against the Japan national women's ice hockey team, Gavrilova scored two goals in the second game, gaining Player of the Game honors.

Personal life 
During her college ice hockey career, Gavrilova completed a bachelor's degree in accounting while from the University of Minnesota Duluth (UMD) and a BA in economics from the University of Calgary (U of C). She works as an analyst at Crescent Point Energy in Calgary, Alberta.

Career statistics

NCAA
Note: GP= Games played; G= Goals; A= Assists; PTS = Points; PIM = Penalties in minutes; GW = Game winning goals; PPL = Power-play goals; SHG = Short-handed goals

WWHL

Olympics

CIS

CWHL

Awards and honors
2012 Canada West First Team All-Star
2015 Brodrick Trophy winner
2015 Canada West Conference Player of the Year
2014–15 CIS First Team All-Star

References

External links

1987 births
Living people
Ice hockey players at the 2006 Winter Olympics
Ice hockey players at the 2010 Winter Olympics
Ice hockey players at the 2014 Winter Olympics
Calgary Inferno players
Sportspeople from Krasnoyarsk
Russian women's ice hockey forwards
Olympic ice hockey players of Russia
Minnesota Duluth Bulldogs women's ice hockey players
Calgary Dinos ice hockey players
Russian expatriate ice hockey people
Russian expatriate sportspeople in Canada
Russian expatriate sportspeople in the United States
Universiade medalists in ice hockey
Universiade gold medalists for Russia
Competitors at the 2015 Winter Universiade
Professional Women's Hockey Players Association players
HC Tornado players